Breakaway is a British quiz show presented by Nick Hancock, which aired on BBC Two from 12 March to 2 November 2012. In it, six contestants compete for a cash jackpot of up to £10,000. They can win a smaller amount by working together, or one or two may choose to "break away" from the group in order to win a larger amount for themselves.

Rules
 The game is played on two parallel paths laid out along the studio floor, each consisting of 30 steps. The white main path is wide enough to accommodate all six contestants, while the narrow red "breakaway" path can hold only two.

Seven categories are displayed at the start of the game, and the contestants are given a chance to move onto the breakaway path (see "Breaking away" below). If no one does so, one of the categories is chosen at random and a question is asked to the entire team. They have 15 seconds to discuss it and select one member to move forward onto the next step of the main path, and that contestant must respond for the team. If the answer is correct, £100 is added to the team jackpot and the other members step forward as well. If the answer is incorrect, the responding contestant steps back and the jackpot is reset to zero.

After every third correct answer, the current category is discarded and a new one is chosen in its place. Once all seven categories have been used, all remaining questions are general knowledge with a 30-second time limit. If the team reaches the end of the main path, each member receives an equal share of the jackpot.

Breaking away
At certain points during the game, the contestants are offered a chance to "break away" from the team and attempt to win the entire jackpot for themselves. These "break points" occur immediately at the beginning, then after every third step through #27, and finally after step #29.

Up to two contestants may occupy the breakaway path at any given time. If it is empty when the team reaches a break point, the members are given five seconds to signal whether they wish to break away, by pressing the buzzers they carry with them. The first to do so (if any) moves onto the breakaway path and may, at their discretion, invite one team member to join them and assist; the invited member may accept or decline. If a single contestant reaches a break point, they may invite a team member to join them. If two contestants reach a break point together, the game continues normally. If a contestant breaks away at the start of the game, £1,000 is added to the jackpot and that contestant gets to choose the first category.

A contestant on the breakaway path must answer all questions on their own, with no help except from their partner (if there is one), and adds £300 to the jackpot for each correct answer. A miss puts them in danger of immediate elimination (see "Lives" below). If a solo breakaway contestant reaches the end of the path, they win the entire jackpot; if two reach it together, each wins half the money.

If the breakaway path becomes empty, the rest of the team moves up to the last step reached and continues the game, earning £100 per correct answer until/unless another member decides to break away. If only two contestants remain in the game when a break point is reached, and both are on the breakaway path, then the one who entered it later is eliminated. If all six contestants are eliminated from the game, no one wins any money.

Lives
After every third step through #15, the contestants have a chance to win a "life" by identifying a person, place, or thing based on clues given by the host. Contestants may buzz-in at any time; an incorrect answer locks them out of the rest of the question. The contestant who responds correctly may either receive a life from the host or steal one from someone else, if there are any available. The life question is played before the contestants are offered a chance to break away, and the contestant who answers it correctly gets to choose the next category after that decision has been made.

Lives are used as insurance against elimination on the breakaway path, as follows:

 Single contestant misses, no lives: Immediate elimination; rest of team moves up to that position.
 Single contestant misses, with lives: Lose one life, remain in the game.
 Two contestants miss, each with lives: One loses a life, based on team decision.
 Two contestants miss, only one with lives: Team decides to either eliminate the contestant with no lives or take a life from the one who has them.
 Two contestants miss, no lives: One is eliminated, based on team decision.

Eliminated contestants leave the game with no winnings.

Series 2
A second series began on 8 October 2012, with a few rule changes from Series 1.

 The path has been shortened to 25 steps, with break points at the start and after every third step through #24.
 Six categories are in play, each used for three of the first 18 steps, followed by general knowledge for the last seven.
 Correct answers on the breakaway path add £400 to the jackpot.
 If a contestant chooses to break away at the start of the game, no money is added to the jackpot.
 Lives can be earned only after steps #3, #6, #9, and #12, and contestants can no longer steal lives from one another.
 If the team misses a question on the main path, any member who has at least one life may sacrifice it (by pressing their buzzer within five seconds) to prevent the jackpot from being reset to zero.

The 20th and final episode of the series, broadcast on 2 November 2012, was a Champion of Champions game, with the six top winners of the series returning to try and win another £10,000.

Transmissions

Reception
Readers of UKGameshows.com named it the best new game show of 2012 in their "Hall of fame" poll.

International version

Chinese version 
The Chinese version of this show is called "谁敢站出来"(Simplified Chinese Characters, English meaning: Who dares to stand out?). The first season is premiered on 26 October 2013, and it will be aired at Zhejiang Satellite Television on 21:10 (UTC+8) every Saturday night in the subsequent weeks. The show is presented by Shen Tao, a Chinese host who was one of the former hosts of the Chinese version of Deal or No Deal.

The rules are similar to Series 2 of the original version. If a contestant chooses to break away at the start of the game, the day's jackpot starts at ￥5,000 ($820, £506). Questions on the main and breakaway paths are respectively worth ￥500 ($82, £51) and ￥2,000 ($328, £203), allowing for a potential maximum prize of ￥55,000 ($9,025, £5,571). 

The largest prize awarded to date is ¥38,500, won by a solo breakaway contestant on 9 November 2013.

References

External links

2012 British television series debuts
2012 British television series endings
2010s British game shows
BBC high definition shows
BBC television game shows
English-language television shows
Television series by Sony Pictures Television